James Chalmers is the name of:

James Chalmers (loyalist) (c. 1730–1806), Scottish-born Loyalist officer from Maryland in the American Revolutionary War
James Chalmers (inventor) (1782–1853), Scottish inventor of the adhesive postage stamp
James Ronald Chalmers (1831–1898), ; American politician
James Chalmers (missionary) (1841–1901), Scottish-born missionary to New Guinea
James Chalmers (actor) (born 1974), British actor

See also
Jim Chalmers (disambiguation)
James Chalmers McRuer (1890–1985), Canadian lawyer and author